This is a list of primary and secondary schools in San Diego, California, organized by school district.

The San Diego Unified School District, also known as San Diego City Schools, is the school district that serves the majority of the city, it includes 113 elementary schools, 23 middle schools, 4 atypical schools, 10 alternative schools, 27 high schools, and 25 charter schools. In the northern part of the city, Poway Unified School District and San Dieguito Union High School District are districts outside city limits, but serve several schools within city limits. In the southern part of the city, Sweetwater Union High School District serves multiple schools within city limits, although it is headquartered outside city limits.

High schools

Charter

Private denominational

Private nonsectarian

Poway Unified

San Diego Unified

San Dieguito Union

Middle/Junior high schools

Private nonsectarian

Poway Unified

San Diego Unified

San Dieguito Union

Elementary schools

Private Independent

Private Classical

Private Denominational

Cardiff School District

Encinitas Union

Poway Unified

San Diego Unified

Preschool through High School

Private denominational

Private nonsectarian

Other schools
Monarch School (San Diego), a preschool-through-12 school exclusively for children impacted by homelessness, run as a public-private partnership between The Monarch School Project and the San Diego County Office of Education
Art of Problem Solving Online School (San Diego), offers math and computer science courses online at the middle school and high school level. This school offers courses directly to students and their families as well as through arrangements with other schools.

See also
List of high schools in San Diego County, California
List of school districts in San Diego County, California

Schools primary
.
.
.